Indian Creek is a  long tributary of the Boise River in the U.S. state of Idaho. Indian Creek has a  watershed.

See also
List of rivers of Idaho
List of longest streams of Idaho

References

Rivers of Ada County, Idaho
Rivers of Canyon County, Idaho
Rivers of Elmore County, Idaho
Rivers of Idaho